The 1926–27 Coppa Italia was the 2nd edition of the Coppa Italia domestic cup. It was interrupted in the round of 32 due to lack of interest.

First round

Zone A 

Replay match

Zone B 

* The match annulled as referee did not arrive.

Replay match

Zone C 

np.= not played

Second round 
50 clubs are added.

Replay match

np.= not played

Third round 
29 clubs are added.

* Not played repeat.

np.= not played

Round of 32 

np.= not played

The tournament abandoned due to total lack of interest.

References

rsssf.com

Coppa Italia seasons
1926–27 domestic association football cups
Coppa
Cancelled association football competitions